Georgia Nanscawen (born 27 May 1992) is an Australian rules footballer and former field hockey player

Field hockey career

Georgia Nanscawen is a former Field Hockey Player for Australia. She retired in 2018 with 205 caps and scored 37 goals.
She was selected for the Hockeyroos as a 16 year old school girl (the third youngest selected player)  and made her debut in Durban, South Africa the day after her 17th birthday, scoring a goal on debut. She is the youngest woman to play 100 and 150 international matches for Australia.
She commenced her hockey career aged 5 with the Essendon Hockey Club and aged 13 was the first girl to win an Essendon Hockey Club Boys Best and Fairest Award. She was also the first girl to captain a boys shield team. She represented Victoria at State Level in 2003, 2004, 2005, 2006, 2007 and 2008. She was awarded a full Victorian Institute Hockey Scholarship in 2008. 
In February 2009 she was selected into the Senior Victorian Team (The Victorian Vipers) playing in the Australian Hockey League (AHL). Following the conclusion of the tournament she was selected into the Australian Team.
As part of the Victorian Vipers competing in the AHL she was a member of the gold winning teams in 2012 and 2017 and in 2016 was named Player of the Tournament. She was also named in the Victorian Vipers ALL STAR team in 2018.
Her major International Tournaments include:

CHAMPIONS TROPHY, Sydney Australia 2009 (Silver)
JUNIOR WORLD CUP, Boston USA 2009
WORLD CUP, Rosario Argentina 2010
OCEANIA CUP, Hobart, Australia 2011
CHAMPIONS CHALLENGE, London UK 2012
OLYMPIC GAMES, London UK 2012
WORLD LEAGUE (semi fimal) London UK 2013 (gold)
JUNIOR WORLD CUP, Monchengladbach, Germany 2013
WORLD CUP, The Hague, Netherlands 2014 (Silver)
COMMONWEALTH GAMES, Glasgow, Scotland 2014 (Gold)
CHAMPIONS TROPHY Mendoza, Argentina 2014 (Silver)
HOCKEY WORLD LEAGUE, Antwerp, Belgium 2015 (Bronze)
CHAMPIONS TROPHY, London, UK 2016
WORLD LEAGUE, Belgium 2017

AFL Women's career
In May 2018 she announced that she would join North Melbourne in the AFL Women's for the 2019 season. She made her AFLW football debut in the opening round, when North Melbourne beat Carlton. At the end of the season, she was delisted by North Melbourne.

In 2021, Nanscawen was named the 2021 VFL Women's season best and fairest and awarded the Lambert-Pearce Medal. With 17 votes, she finished four clear atop the leaderboard. She was also named as captain in the VFLW team of the year.
In March 2022, Nanscawen signed as Essendon's first AFLW player. She was selected as co-captain of the Essendon VFLW team and led the team to their first premiership. During the course of the VFLW Grandfinal she ruptured her ACL putting her out of the inaugural AFLW season in which she was also voted as co-vice captain . She also won consecutive Lambert-Pearce medals polling 33 votes from a possible 36 votes. She also took out the inaugural VFLW Coaches Association MVP and was named in her third consecutive VFLW Team of the Year. She also won a second Essendon VFLW Best and Fairest.

References

External links
 

1992 births
Living people
Australian female field hockey players
Field hockey players at the 2012 Summer Olympics
Olympic field hockey players of Australia
Field hockey players at the 2014 Commonwealth Games
Commonwealth Games medallists in field hockey
Commonwealth Games gold medallists for Australia
North Melbourne Football Club (AFLW) players
Female field hockey forwards
Australian rules footballers from Melbourne
People from Brunswick, Victoria
Field hockey players from Melbourne
Sportswomen from Victoria (Australia)
Victorian Institute of Sport alumni
People educated at University High School, Melbourne
Essendon Football Club (AFLW) players
Medallists at the 2014 Commonwealth Games